Avaliden is a village in the municipality of Norsjö in Västerbotten County, Sweden. It is located approximately 7 km south of Norsjö. Although Avaliden is only seasonally inhabited now, its population in 1846 was 211.

References

Populated places in Västerbotten County